Potentilla nivea, called the snow cinquefoil, snowy cinquefoil, and villous cinquefoil, is a species of flowering plant in the genus Potentilla, native to Subarctic Asia, North America, Greenland, and Europe, and the Subalpine Rockies and Alps. It comes in many ploidy levels; 2x, 3x, 4x, 5x, 6x, 7x, 8x and 10x.

References

nivea
Taxa named by Carl Linnaeus
Plants described in 1753